The Village at Corte Madera is an upscale lifestyle center located in Corte Madera, California. It opened in September 1985 with department stores Macy's and Nordstrom, and is owned and operated by Macerich.

History
The Village at Corte Madera was developed by The Hahn Company and opened in September 1985, anchored by a 116,000 square foot Nordstrom and a 110,000 square foot Macy's. Spanning  of retail space, the mall was purchased by Macerich in 1997.

Major stores
In addition to the two department stores, the center features 65 upscale tenants including Williams Sonoma, Kate Spade New York, Anthropologie, a Tesla Motors showroom, and an Apple Store. Home furnishings retailer RH (formerly Restoration Hardware), which is based in Corte Madera, operates two stores at The Village, including a three-level Design Gallery with a rooftop restaurant.

See also
The Mall at Northgate
Macerich Company
Town Center at Corte Madera

References

External links
 Official Village at Corte Madera website
 Macerich Company website

Shopping malls in Marin County, California
Corte Madera, California
Macerich
1985 establishments in California
Shopping malls established in 1985
Shopping malls in the San Francisco Bay Area